La madrecita (The Nun) is a 1974 Mexican film directed by Fernándo Cortés and starring María Elena Velasco as La India María, with Pancho Córdova and Óscar Ortiz de Pinedo.

External links

Mexican comedy films
1974 comedy films
1974 films
1970s Spanish-language films
1970s Mexican films